Joliette is a city in southwest Quebec, Canada. It is considered to be a part of the North Shore of Greater Montreal. The city is home to the Joliette Art Museum, whose works of art include paintings, sculptures, paper artwork and a large collection of art from the French Middle Ages.

Joliette has 3 Francophone high schools and 1 Anglophone high school, as well as the Joliette campus of the Cégep régional de Lanaudière.

It was founded as L'Industrie by the businessman Barthélemy Joliette in 1823 and was incorporated as a city in 1863, when it changed its name to Joliette..

The city's economy is mainly in the manufacturing and service sectors.  The largest gravel manufacturer in the area, Graybec, is located in Joliette and exploits a huge quarry just outside the city.

Joliette is the seat of the judicial district of Joliette.

Demographics 

7.1% of residents were visible minorities, 2.4% were Indigenous, and the remaining 90.5% were white/European. The largest visible minority groups were Black (3.1%), Latin American (1.7%) and Arab (1.3%).

French was the mother tongue of 92.3% of residents. Other common first languages were Spanish (1.2%), English (1.1%), Arabic (0.8%) and Atikamekw (0.5%). 1.0% claimed both French and English as mother tongues, and 0.9% listed both French and a non-official language.

65.6% of residents were Christian, down from 85.4% in 2011. 58.2% were Catholic, 4.7% were Christian n.o.s, 0.7% and were Protestants. All other Christian denominations and Christian-related traditions made up 1.9% of the population. 31.3% of the population were non-religious or secular, up from 11.8% in 2011. The only named non-Christians religions with a significant following in Joliette were Islam (2.4%) and Buddhism (0.3%). All other religions and spiritual traditions made up 0.5% of the population.

Government and infrastructure 
Joliette is the seat of the judicial district of Joliette.

Joliette Institution for Women, a prison of the Correctional Service of Canada, is in this town.

Economy
The city's economy is mainly in the manufacturing and service sectors.  The largest gravel manufacturer in the area, Graybec, is located in Joliette and exploits a huge quarry just outside the city.
 
In the center of the city is Galeries Joliette, which has nearly 100 retailers as well as a 5-storey office building.

Local institutions 
Post-secondary:
  - Collège Constituent de Joliette

Commission scolaire des Samares operates Francophone public schools;
 École secondaire Thérèse-Martin
 École secondaire Barthélemy-Joliette
 École Primaire Les Mélèzes
 École Primaire Saint-Pierre (Marie-Charlotte)

Anglophone schools are operated by the Sir Wilfrid Laurier School Board:
 Joliette Elementary School in Saint-Charles-Borromée
 Joliette High School

Private schools:
  (francophone)

Diocese 
 Diocese of Joliette
 St. Charles Borromeo Cathedral

Notable people
 A.J. Greer - ice hockey player
 Francine Racette - actress
 Charles Richard-Hamelin - concert pianist
 Dominique Ducharme - former head coach of the Montreal Canadiens
 Paul Tellier - businessman and public servant
 Marie-Hélène Turcotte - animated film director and artist
 Victor Desautels - actor, pianist, and physicist

See also
List of cities in Quebec

References

External links 

Ville de Joliette
Diocèse de Joliette

 
Cities and towns in Quebec